Jindřiška Šimková (born 21 February 1965) is a Czech former sports shooter. She competed in two events at the 1992 Summer Olympics.

References

External links
 
 

1965 births
Living people
North Korean female sport shooters
Olympic shooters of Czechoslovakia
Shooters at the 1992 Summer Olympics
People from Pelhřimov
Sportspeople from the Vysočina Region